The ninth season of NCIS: Los Angeles premiered on October 1, 2017 on CBS for the 2017–18 television season, and concluded on May 20, 2018. The season contained 24 episodes and the series’ 200th episode. Nia Long joined the cast as Shay Mosley for the ninth season after Miguel Ferrer's death.

The ninth season ranked 23 with a total of 10.50 million viewers.

Cast

Main 
 Chris O'Donnell as Grisha "G." Callen, NCIS Special Agent in Charge (SAC)
 Daniela Ruah as Kensi Blye, NCIS Junior Special Agent
 Eric Christian Olsen as Marty Deeks, L.A.P.D. Detective And Liaison To NCIS
 Barrett Foa as Eric Beale, NCIS Technical Operator
 Renée Felice Smith as Nell Jones, NCIS Special Agent and Intelligence Analyst
 Nia Long as Shay Mosley, NCIS Executive Assistant Director for Pacific Operations (EADPAC)
 Linda Hunt as Henrietta Lange, NCIS Supervisory Special Agent (SSA) and Operations Manager
 LL Cool J as Sam Hanna, NCIS Senior Special Agent, second in command

Recurring 
 Vyto Ruginis as Arkady Kolcheck
 Bar Paly as Anastasia "Anna" Kolcheck, an ATF Agent and Callen's girlfriend.
 John M. Jackson as Rear Admiral A. J. Chegwidden, JAGC, USN (Ret.)
 Andrea Bordeaux as Harley Hidoko, NCIS Special Agent and Executive Assistant to the EADPAC.
 Jeff Kober as Harris Keane
 Pamela Reed as Roberta Deeks, Deeks' mother.
 Daniel J. Travanti as Nikita Aleksandr Reznikov / Garrison, Callen's father
 Ravil Isyanov as Anatoli Kirkin
 Patrick St. Esprit as LAPD Lieutenant Roger Bates
  Karina Logue as LAPD Detective Ellen Whiting
 Max Martini as Arlo Turk
 Bobby Lee as Rio Syamsundin
 Drew Waters as Brian Bush, FBI Agent
 Malese Jow as Jennifer Kim
 David Paul Olsen as Tom Olsen, Sam’s former SEAL buddy

Episodes

Ratings

Home video release

References 

09
2017 American television seasons
2018 American television seasons